The 1941 Mississippi State Maroons football team was an American football team that represented Mississippi State College in the Southeastern Conference (SEC) during the 1941 college football season. In their third season under head coach Allyn McKeen, the Maroons compiled an 8–1–1 record (4–0–1 against SEC opponents), won the only SEC championship in school history, outscored opponents by a total of 191 to 55, and were ranked No. 16 in the final AP Poll.

After losing eight of eleven starters from the undefeated 1940 team, the Maroons were picked to finish at or near the bottom of the SEC in 1941.  Yet, they won games against conference opponents, Florida, Alabama, Auburn, and Ole Miss, and played a scoreless tie against LSU. The sole loss of the season was to No. 10 Duquesne. The 1941 season was the second consecutive season in which Mississippi State went undefeated against SEC opponents. 

Two Mississippi State players were named to the 1941 All-SEC football team. Tackle Bill Arnold received first-team honors from the Associated Press (AP) and second-team honors from the United Press (UP). Halfback Johnnie "Blondy" Black was picked by the UP for the second team.

Schedule

References

Mississippi State
Mississippi State Bulldogs football seasons
Southeastern Conference football champion seasons
Mississippi State Maroons football